The 1982 World Championship Tennis circuit was one of the two rival professional male tennis circuits of 1982. It was organized by World Championship Tennis (WCT). 

On 30 April 1981 WCT announced its withdrawal from the Grand Prix circuit, into which it had been incorporated since the 1978 season, and the re-establishment of its own full calendar season for 1982. According to WCT owner Lamar Hunt the reasons for the withdrawal were the restrictions placed on them by the Men's Professional Council, the administrators of the Grand Prix circuit. The 1982 WCT circuit consisted of a Spring Tour, with nine tournaments, a Summer/Fall Tour, with five tournaments, and a Winter Tour with six tournaments. Each tour segment had its own finals tournament (Dallas, Naples and Detroit respectively). 
Total prize money, including bonuses, for the circuit was $7,933,000, which represented an increase of approximately $5 million compared to 1981.

Calendar

Spring circuit

Summer / Fall circuit

Winter circuit

* The Detroit World Championship Tennis Winter Finals was played in January 1983 but was part of the 1982 WCT season.

Prize money leaders
Prize money earned at WCT events during the calendar year 1982, excluding the Winter Finals played in Detroit in January 1983.

Standings
The 1982 WCT season was divided into three segments, the Spring Tour, the Summer/Fall Tour and the Winter Tour. These are the standings of the top twenty singles players on the WCT circuit for each of these segments.

See also
 1982 Grand Prix circuit

References

External links
 1976 ATP results archive

 
World Championship Tennis circuit seasons
World Championship Tennis